Allen Miller may refer to:

Allen R Miller (1943–2010), American mathematician
Allen Miller (golfer) (born 1948), American golfer
Allen Miller (American football) (born 1940), American football linebacker
Allen J. Miller (1901–1991), American prelate

See also
Alan Miller (disambiguation)
Alan Millar (born 1947), philosopher
Allan Miller (born 1929), American actor
Allan Miller (footballer) (1925–2006), Australian rules footballer